Seppo Vainio (3 January 1937 – 14 December 2020) was a Finnish ice hockey player. He competed in the men's tournament at the 1960 Winter Olympics.

References

External links
 

1937 births
2020 deaths
Olympic ice hockey players of Finland
Ice hockey players at the 1960 Winter Olympics
People from Rauma, Finland
Sportspeople from Satakunta